Kim Min-jung or Kim Min-jeong is a Korean name consisting of the family name Kim and the given name Min-jung, and may refer to:

Kim Min-jung (actress) (born 1982), South Korean actress
Kim Min-jung (badminton) (born 1986), South Korean badminton player
Kim Min-jung (speed skater) (born 1985), South Korean speed skater
Kim Min-jung (sport shooter) (born 1997), South Korean sport shooter
Kim Min-jung (TV presenter), news anchor and host for Arirang TV
Kim Min-jung (curler), South Korean curler, participated in the 2012 Pacific-Asia Curling Championships
Kim Min-Jung (taekwondo), South Korean taekwondo practitioner, earned a gold medal for South Korea at the 2009 Asian Martial Arts Games
Kim Min-jeong (synchronized swimmer), South Korean synchronized swimmer, competed in synchronized swimming at the 2002 Asian Games
Kim Min-jeong (basketball), South Korean basketball player, played in the 2013 FIBA Under-19 World Championship for Women
Kim Min-jeong (judoka) (born 1997), South Korean judoka
Kim Min-jeong (footballer) (born 1996), South Korean footballer
Kim Min-jeong (poet) (born 1976), South Korean poet and literary editor

See also
Kim Min-jong (born 1971), South Korean actor and singer